Callum Ashley J Brodrick (born 24 January 1998) is an English cricketer. He made his Twenty20 cricket debut for Derbyshire in the 2017 NatWest t20 Blast on 19 July 2017. He made his first-class debut for Derbyshire against the West Indies on 11 August 2017 during their tour of England. He signed a two-year professional contract with Derbyshire in September 2017. He made his List A debut for Derbyshire in the 2018 Royal London One-Day Cup on 1 June 2018.

References

External links
 

1998 births
Living people
English cricketers
Derbyshire cricketers
Sportspeople from Burton upon Trent